The Royale Sports 2000 series, namely the Royale S2000M, the Royale RP37, the Royale RP38, and the Royale RP42, are a series of Sports 2000 prototype race cars, designed, developed and built by British manufacturer Royale, for 2-liter sports car racing, between 1981 and 1985.

References

Sports prototypes